Parechthistatus furcifer is a species of beetle in the family Cerambycidae. It was described by Henry Walter Bates in 1884.

References

Phrissomini
Beetles described in 1884